FC Baikonur was a Kazakh football club based at the Lokomativ Arena in Kyzylorda.

The club has dissolved after the 2022 season.

Final squad

References

External links
Squad list at PFLK

Defunct football clubs in Kazakhstan
2015 establishments in Kazakhstan
2023 disestablishments in Kazakhstan
Association football clubs established in 2015
Association football clubs disestablished in 2023
Syr-Darya Oblast